The Eastern Hills of Bogotá is a threatened but rich area of biodiversity. Various species have been registered in the Eastern Hills of the Colombian capital.

Flora 

In the Eastern Hills a total of 443 species of flora have been identified, of which 156 species in 111 genera and 64 families of vascular plants.

A study published in 2013 lists as most important and characteristic species:

Birds 

Colombia is the country with the most recorded bird species (1912 as of 2014) in the world. The biodiversity of bird species in the Eastern Hills is higher than in the parks of urban Bogotá. The northern part of the reserve is richer in bird species due to the dense forests and larger space between the urban zones. Birds of 30 families, 92 genera and 119 species have been identified in the Eastern Hills.

Mammals 
Mammals of 14 families, 17 genera and 18 species have been identified in the Eastern Hills. Until the first half of the twentieth century, the Eastern Hills were populated by larger species as the puma, spectacled bear and white-tailed deer, but these species have been hunted to extinction.

Reptiles 

Reptiles of four families, five genera and five species have been identified in the Eastern Hills. Of these species, only the lizards Anadia bogotensis and Proctoporus striatus have been found on the Guadalupe Hill. The striped lightbulb lizard is also present on the terrain of the Universidad de los Andes.

Amphibians 
Amphibians of four families, six genera and nine species have been identified in the Eastern Hills.

Fish 
Three species of fish have been identified in the waters of the Eastern Hills. Of Trichomycterus venulosus only two specimens have been found, and it is thought the species is extinct in the rivers of the Eastern Hills, which may have to do with the introduction of trout.

Butterflies 
In the Eastern Hills two species of butterflies have been identified.

See also 

 List of flora and fauna named after the Muisca
 Biodiversity of Colombia
 Thomas van der Hammen Natural Reserve

References

Bibliography 
 
 
 
 
 
 

Eastern Hills
Bogotá
Flora and fauna